Marius Lundemo (born 11 April 1994) is a Norwegian professional footballer who plays as a defensive midfielder.

Club career

Bærum
He started his career in Bærum SK. He made his senior debut in a friendly match in March 2010. He then made his league debut in late 2010. Ahead of the 2011 season he was officially drafted into the first team. He started his first match in August 2011.

Lillestrøm
Ahead of the 2014 season, Lundemo transferred to the first-tier club Lillestrøm. He made his league debut for Lillestrøm in March 2014 against Haugesund. After the 2016 season Lundemo opted to leave Lillestrøm with his contract expiring at the end of the year.

Rosenborg
In December 2016, Lundemo signed for Rosenborg.

APOEL
In June 2020, Lundemo signed for APOEL starting from 1 August when his contract with Rosenborg expires.

Career statistics

Club

Honours

Club
Rosenborg
Eliteserien (2):  2017, 2018
Norwegian Cup (1):  2018

References

1994 births
Living people
Sportspeople from Bærum
Norwegian footballers
Bærum SK players
Lillestrøm SK players
Rosenborg BK players
APOEL FC players
Norwegian First Division players
Eliteserien players
Association football midfielders
Expatriate footballers in Cyprus
Norwegian expatriate sportspeople in Cyprus